Auboncourt-Vauzelles is a commune in the Ardennes department in the Grand Est region of north-eastern France.

Geography

Auboncourt-Vauzelles is located some 38 km south-west of Charleville-Mézières and 16 km north-east of Rethel. The A34 autoroute passes through the north-west of the commune but the nearest exit is Exit 14 some 6 km north of the commune. Access to the commune is by the D 951 road from Novy-Chevrières in the south-west which passes through the north-west of the commune and the hamlet of Vauzelles as it goes north to join the A34 autoroute at Exit 14. The D 14 road comes from Corny-Machéroménil in the north-west which passes through Vauzelles and the centre of the commune before continuing south to Faux. Access to the village is by small roads that run off the D 14 - the Chemin d'Auboncourt and the Chemin de la Fontaine. The commune is entirely farmland except for the fringe of the Bois d'Auboncourt forest in the north-east.

The Ruisseau de Saulces flows through the east of the commune and the village from north to south-east and continues to join the Aisne south of Amagne.

Neighbouring communes and villages

Administration

Demography
In 2017 the commune had 100 inhabitants. The population data given in the table and graph below for 1821 and earlier refer to the former commune of Auboncourt. The number for 1793 includes the commune of Monclin.

See also
 Communes of the Ardennes department

References

External links

 Auboncourt-Vauzelles on the old IGN website 
 Auboncourt-Vauzelles on Géoportail, National Geographic Institute (IGN) website 
 Auboncourt and Vauzelles on the 1750 Cassini Map

Communes of Ardennes (department)